Throes of Joy in the Jaws of Defeatism is the sixteenth studio album by British grindcore band Napalm Death. It was released on 18 September 2020 through Century Media.

It is the band's first full-length studio album since 2015's Apex Predator – Easy Meat, making it their longest gap between albums.

Metal Hammer named it as the second best metal album of 2020.

Track listing

Personnel
Credits are adapted from the album's liner notes.

Napalm Death
 Barney Greenway – vocals
 Shane Embury – bass, backing vocals, noises, guitars 
 Danny Herrera – drums

Additional musicians
 John Cooke – guitars 
 Russ Russell – noises

Production and design
 Russ Russell – production, recording, engineering, mixing, mastering
 Frode Sundbø Sylthe – artwork, layout
 Gobinder Jhitta – photography

Charts

References

2020 albums
Century Media Records albums
Napalm Death albums
Albums produced by Russ Russell